The Ezidxane Asayish, are the police force in the regions controlled by the PKK-affiliated Sinjar Resistance Units. The force is a Yazidi organization which aims to protect the rights of this minority. It has a training post in Sinjar, where the policemen are trained by the PKK. The force also gets officially financial aid from the Iraqi Government.

The Asayîşa Êzîdxanê are officially not subordinated to the Sinjar Resistance Units and shall attenuate the dependence from institutional powers. The lack of faith in the official powers is a consequence of the escape of Peshmerga-troops in August 2014, which enabled the Genocide of Yazidis by ISIL, which overrun the lines of the Peshmerga into the land of the Yazidis. The new-founded force has the aim to create safety in the area controlled by the PKK and Sinjar Resistance Units to enable the return of the Yazidis in the exodus. Recently, about 90% of the Yazidis hasn't returned to Sinjar yet.

There are tensions with the KDP of the Iraqi Kurdistan region, because the KDP wants to rule over the Sinjar mountains again, while many Yazidis feel betrayed and prefer self-defense and -determination now.

See also
 List of armed groups in the Iraqi Civil War
 December 2014 Sinjar offensive
 Yazidi genocide
 List of Yazidi settlements

References

Apoist organizations in Iraq
Anti-ISIL factions in Iraq
Law enforcement in Iraq
Paramilitary organizations based in Iraq
Sinjar Alliance
Yazidi organizations in Iraq